Schúbert Gambetta Saint Léon (14 April 1920 – 9 August 1991) was a Uruguayan footballer. He played as a half-back and was right-footed. Gambetta was a figure in the Maracanazo when he helped keep Zizinho and Ademir out of the game, which helped him to the 1950 FIFA World Cup All-Star Team.

From 1940 to 1956, he played for Club Nacional de Football, winning the Uruguayan championship ten times and captaining the team. He also earned 37 caps and scored three goals for the Uruguay national football team from 1941 to 1952. He was part of Uruguay's championship team at the 1950 FIFA World Cup.

Domestic Honours
 Primera División Uruguaya Winner: 1940, 1941, 1942, 1943, 1946, 1947, 1950, 1952, 1955 and 1956.
 Primera División Uruguaya Runner up: 1944, 1945, 1949, 1951, 1953 and 1954.
 Torneo de Honor Winner: 1940, 1941, 1942, 1943, 1946, 1948 and 1955.
 Torneo Competencia Winner: 1942, 1945, 1948 and 1952.
 Torneo Cuadrangular Winner: 1952, 1954 and 1955.
 Copa Aldao (Copa Río de la Plata) Winner: 1940, 1942 and 1946.
 Copa de Confraternidad Escobar - Gerona Winner: 1945.

International honours
 Copa Baron de Rio Branco Winner versus Brasil: 1946 and 1948.
 Copa Escobar Gerona Winner: 1945
 South American Championship 1942 Winner
 South American Championship 1947 Third Place
 1950 FIFA World Cup Winner
 1950 FIFA World Cup All-Star Team

External links
Copa America Winner
Copa America 3rd Place
Profile (in Spanish)
World Cup Final Appearance
International Appearances
All-Star Team 1950

1920 births
1991 deaths
Footballers from Montevideo
Uruguayan footballers
Uruguay international footballers
Uruguayan people of Italian descent
1950 FIFA World Cup players
FIFA World Cup-winning players
Uruguayan Primera División players
Club Nacional de Football players
C.A. Progreso players
Cúcuta Deportivo footballers
Uruguayan expatriate footballers
Expatriate footballers in Colombia
Uruguayan expatriate sportspeople in Colombia
Copa América-winning players
Association football defenders